Gwendalyn F. Cody (April 4, 1922 – May 2, 2021) was an American politician who served as a member of the  Virginia House of Delegates from 1983 to 1986. She was a policy analyst and educator.

Cody died in May 2021, at the age of 99.

References

1922 births
2021 deaths
Republican Party members of the Virginia House of Delegates
Politicians from Richmond, Virginia
University of Puget Sound alumni
Washington and Lee University alumni
University of Chicago alumni
University System of Maryland alumni
20th-century American politicians
20th-century American women politicians